Sternolaelaps is a genus of mites in the family Laelapidae.

Species
 Sternolaelaps utahensis (Ewing, 1933)

References

Laelapidae